Maumee City School District is a public school district in Northwest Ohio. The school district serves students who live in the city of Maumee in Lucas County. The superintendent is Dr. Todd Cramer.  It comprises the following schools:
Fairfield Elementary — grades K-3
Fort Miami Elementary — grades K-3
Wayne Trail Elementary — grades 4-5
Gateway Middle School — grades 6-8
Maumee High School — grades 9-12

External links
District Website

School districts in Ohio
Education in Lucas County, Ohio